Gilbert Plains Airport  was located adjacent to Gilbert Plains, Manitoba, Canada.

References

Defunct airports in Manitoba